The 1970–71 Ashes series was the 45th edition of the long-standing cricket rivalry between England and Australia. Starting on 27 November 1970, the two sides ended up playing seven Tests; six were originally scheduled, but one extra Test was added to compensate for the abandoned Third Test.

Australia went into the series as the holders of the urn, having successfully defended it in 1968, drawing the series 2-all. However, they went into the 1970-71 series having suffered a demoralising 4-0 series defeat in South Africa. Meanwhile, England had gone undefeated in Test cricket since losing at Old Trafford in 1968. Ray Illingworth was appointed captain after the incumbent Colin Cowdrey had injured an Achilles early in 1969, and led England to series victories against West Indies and New Zealand during that English summer. 

The Test matches were scheduled for five days with six hours play each day, with a rest day on the Monday, and overs were eight balls long. It formed part of the MCC tour of Australia in 1970–71 and the matches outside the Tests were played in the name of the Marylebone Cricket Club. Ray Illingworth's England team beat Bill Lawry's Australians 2–0 and regained the Ashes, the only full Test series in Australia in which the home team failed to win a Test. "The Momentous Series of 1970–71" was pivotal in cricket history and "essentially ushered in the modern period of Test cricket". It was the first Test series to have more than five Tests and the first One Day International in cricket history was played in Melbourne; like the first test match in history it was won by Australia.

Ray Illingworth's use of hostile, short-pitched fast-bowling by John Snow, Ken Shuttleworth, Bob Willis and Peter Lever heralded the dominance of fast bowling in the 1970s and 1980s, as did the decline of behaviour by players as the England team united under against ineffectual management, biased umpires, tabloid press and hostile crowds. Snow's 31 wickets (22.83) was the most by an England bowler in Australia since Harold Larwood, and has not been exceeded since. Geoff Boycott had his most prolific series with 657 runs (93.85), John Edrich made 648 runs (72.00), which kept him at the crease for a record 33 hours and 26 minutes, and Brian Luckhurst 455 runs (56.87). Together these three opening batsmen added 995 runs (90.45) for the first wicket with five century and three half-century opening stands.

Rod Marsh, Greg Chappell, Dennis Lillee, Terry Jenner, Alan Thomson, Kerry O'Keeffe, Ross Duncan, Ken Eastwood and Tony Dell made their debuts for Australia and Bob Willis, Brian Luckhurst, Ken Shuttleworth and Peter Lever for England. It also saw the retirement of Bill Lawry and Garth McKenzie from the Australian team and Don Bradman after 35 years as a selector. The WACA Ground in Perth saw its inaugural Test match, the first new venue in an Ashes Test since the Brisbane Cricket Ground at Woolloongabba in 1928–29.

Results summary

England won the 7-Test series 2–0.

Match Details

First Test, 27 November–2 December

The Australian selectors handed Test debuts to three players: Alan Thomson, the 6 ft 2 Victorian paceman with a trademark windmill delivery action, was called up for his debut after taking 6/80 and 3/101 in Victoria's victory over the tourists, along with Western Australian wicket-keeper Rod Marsh and South Australian leg-spinner Terry Jenner. For England, opener Brian Luckhurst and fast bowler Ken Shuttleworth would be handed their first Test caps. The MCC had struggled in the state matches, losing one and drawing the three others. Though Geoff Boycott, Brian Luckhurst, John Edrich and Basil d'Oliveira had batted well none of their bowlers had made their mark and Australia was confident that they had the upper hand. Australian umpire Tom Brooks was officiating in his first Test.

Australia – First Innings
It was a remarkable day's cricket here at "the Gabba". The crowd on the hill shouted "Ave a Go" only 21 times. This was a record for the first day of the first Test against England in Brisbane. The previous record was about 2,800. This was partly due to the eloquence with the bat of Keith Stackpole...tremendously spectacular and entertaining to watch but you felt he was about to slip any second...When running between the wickets...he looks like one of those vintage steam traction engines. And almost as fast.
Keith Dunstan

Bill Lawry won the toss and chose to bat on a good wicket, but became John Snow's 100th Test victim, caught by Alan Knott for 4 off an attempted hook. Keith Stackpole had been promoted from the middle order to open the innings as along with Lawry he was the only Australian who had any confidence against short-pitched bowling. He should have been run out for 18, Geoff Boycott throwing down the wicket at the bowler's end with Derek Underwood backing up. The batsman was given the benefit of the doubt by Lou Rowan, but the Australian newspapers carried photographs the next day showing that he had failed to ground his bat as he crossed the line. This formed a major point of controversy in the media and Rowan's decision was hyperbolically labelled "one of the worst in cricket history". It probably cost England victory as Stackpole went on to make his highest Test score of 207, adding 151 with Ian Chappell (59) and 209 with Doug Walters (112). The new ball was taken in the afternoon, but had to be replaced after five overs due to complaints from Snow and Shuttleworth, though Keith Miller, Ray Lindwall, Bill O'Reilly and Jack Fingleton could find little wrong with it in the press box. Stackpole was told in the afternoon drinks break that he was nearing Bradman's record 187 against England at the Gabba and as a result dug himself in and failed to score for the last half-hour of the day, leaving Australian 308/2. John Edrich met a spectator when fielding on the boundary who told him "You're following in your cousin's footsteps you know. I was sitting here 25 years ago and he spent all day chasing the ball along the same piece of grass. He didn't stop much either". A frustrated Snow forced a nervous Walters to dodge three bouncers in a row and was warned by the umpires for intimidation, not for the last time in the series. Stackpole crawled to 200 on the second day, hit Illingworth for six and gave what may have been a catch behind off Snow at 372/3. He was visibly wilting in the heat and gladly took the opportunity to walk with 207 against his name. Australia looked set to make a huge score, but soon after lunch Illingworth threw himself full length to take a spectacular catch at silly mid-on to dismiss Ian Redpath off Derek Underwood (3/101). Keith Dunstan noted that "Underwood is inclined to wear a hole in the pitch by dropping the ball on the same spot...", but his first 236 balls had failed to take a wicket, now "Deadly Derek" took two wickets in four balls; dismissing Sheahan for a duck and Walters for 112 as 418/3 became 421/6. Snow (6/114) ran through the lower order – Jenner, Gleeson and Thomson all failed to score – and Australia were all out for 433. The loss of seven Australian wickets for 15 runs was their worst collapse since Alec Bedser took 14/99 and Australia fell from 237/3 to 249 all out at Trent Bridge in 1953. As commentator Ted Dexter put it 'People say cricket's slow. I always tell them, "You just have to be prepared to wait a long time between the thrills"'.

England – First Innings
"As I departed just in front of Cannery Row there was a pile of beer cans like a golden pyramid. I would estimate the rate of the day's play at 2,000 cans per wicket and 20 cans per run." Dunstan wasn't far off target. On the first three days of the Test 35,093 spectators consumed 36,872 cans of beer and 890 gallons of draught. The grand total, according to statisticians, was 4,816 gallons...there could not have been many teetotalleers at this Meeting Place of Many Waters.
Richard Whitington

The veteran Garth McKenzie and debutant Alan Thomson departed from line and length with the new ball and Geoff Boycott (37) and Brian Luckhurst (74) added 92 for the first wicket. In the increasing gloom Boycott tried to square-cut a long hop from Johnny Gleeson and edged it to Rodney Marsh, providing the keeper with the first of his 355 victims in Test cricket. Alan Knott came in as nightwatchman and was bounced by Thomson in the poor light, Jack Fingleton claiming that 'He can be excused. he doesn't know where he is bowling.'. In the morning – the first Sunday's play at the Gabba – Knott took his score to 73, joined by John Edrich (79) and Basil d'Oliveira (57) as they slowly batted into the fourth afternoon with the crowd giving them a slow hand-clap. The Monday was a rest day with three and a half inches of rain falling, but the wicket was covered, so there would be no danger of a gluepot as in the 1950–51 Brisbane Test. The following day Colin Cowdrey (28) overtook Wally Hammond's record of 7,249 runs to become the most prolific Test batsmen, which earned him an ovation from the crowd. The "Golden Arm" of Doug Walters was able to both swing the ball and produce line and length to dismiss Knott, take the last two wickets and return figures of 3/12, but the other bowlers suffered; McKenzie 2/90, Thomson 1/136, Gleeson 2/92 and Jenner 1/86. Rod Marsh had been brought in as wicket-keeper because of his superior batting skills and took four catches, but dropped three as he fumbled the ball and was dubbed "Iron Gloves" by the press. England overtook the Australian total to finish with 464, the third highest Test innings without a century at the time, to give them a lead of 31 runs. The Australian selector Neil Harvey commented that Ray Illingworth "gave up any thought of going for a win when he lost the toss", and most of the commentators agreed.

Australia – Second Innings
Snow and Shuttleworth simply lolled back to bowl and each of their overs occupied more than five minutes. The advantage to a pace bowler of slouching between deliveries and winning a longer rest while one's partner is bowling should be obvious...The spectators saw far more of Snow, Shuttleworth, Lever and Willis's walking during the series than they saw of their running.
Richard Whitington

Australia lost two wickets before stumps, then collapsed on the fifth morning to 214 all out. Only the captain made any real resistance, batting for five and a half hours for his 84, though Redpath spent two hours making 28. Surprisingly the destroyer was debutant fast bowler Ken Shuttleworth who took 5/47, his best bowling for England and his only 5 wicket haul in Tests.

England – Second Innings
Needing 183 in just over an hour England were unlikely to win and when Terry Jenner caught and bowled Boycott for 16 it was decided to call an end to the match. England were left on 39/1, paying the price for their slow first innings.

Result
Next morning Bobby Simpson wrote, 'England have come out of the Test with a moral victory.' They could have had a flesh and blood triumph.
Richard Whitington
Despite the Australians collapsing in both innings they drew the First Test with England to leave the teams 0–0 in the series. 42,376 people attended the match over the five days, paying $36,612.10 at the gate.

Second Test – Perth

Preliminaries
I wonder if Bill Lawry and Ray Illingworth knew of the tremendous effort that had been put by the people of Western Australia into the staging of this 205th Test between England and Australia? I wonder whether their teams were aware of it? If the answer to both of these questions is in the affirmative, their reaction was lamentable – by and large...they muffed it –  massacred it.
Richard Whitington
This was the inaugural Test match at the WACA Ground in Perth and the first new venue in an Ashes Test since the Brisbane Cricket Ground at Woolloongabba in 1928–29. Western Australia had won the Sheffield Shield in 1947–48 on percentages even though they had played fewer games than the eastern states and outright in 1968–69. Test status was granted to the WACA for the 1970–71 Ashes series and although its playing conditions were equal to any in Australia $400,000 was raised to build extra stands and improve the facilities. The state government supplied $100,000 and Perth City Council another $20,000. The remaining $280,000 was raised by public subscription, with Norm O'Neill, Keith Slater and Peter Loader touring the state in aid of the cause. Farmers donated barley, wheat, oats, timber, sheep and cattle to be sold for the fund, one town built and sold a house and the racehorse La Loire made $18,000 in a raffle. 'Pre-Test interest was tremendous. You could not make a move in Perth just prior to the Test without breakfasting, lunching and dining-out on cricket...' On a pitch expected to suit fast bowling the two sides dropped their spinners Terry Jenner and Derek Underwood. The Lancashire fast-medium swing bowler Peter Lever made his Test debut as did Greg Chappell, the young South Australian all-rounder who had been twelfth man at Brisbane. However, this gave Australia only three specialist bowlers; Garth McKenzie, Alan Thomson and John Gleeson and England four; John Snow, Ken Shuttleworth, Peter Lever and Ray Illingworth. Lindsay Hassett commented that "you can scarcely get a decent Test attack from the two sides".

England – First Innings
Lawry, the conservative, became Lawry, the cavalier...He was not the "Laughing Cavalier"...Did he hope that there was a vestige of early life in the reputedly fast Perth wicket? If he did, he was disappointed, for, while McKenzie did manage to make a few deliveries rise with shoulder strength and even rapped Luckhurst painfully on the hand, the pitch remained placidly amenable all day.
Frank Tyson
Bill Lawry won the toss and to the amazement of the Australian commentators put England in to bat, later saying that he had only one spinner and did not expect the wicket to turn. Ray Illingworth requested the use of a roller on the wicket before play began, but this was turned down by umpire Lou Rowan, who apologised in the lunch break when he realised his mistake. Even so, Geoff Boycott and Brian Luckhurst added 171 for the first wicket when Boycott was out for 70. Luckhurst made his maiden Test century (131) despite having his thumb injured by McKenzie on 15. With the help of John Edrich (47) he took England to 243 before a second wicket fell and they finished the first day on 257/2. Their cause was helped by Rod Marsh, Ian Chappell and Keith Stackpole dropping five catches between them, three off Garth McKenzie playing on his home turf. The next day Greg Chappell caught and bowled Colin Cowdrey for 40 at 389/7 and McKenzie (4/66) wrapped up the tail to dismiss England for 397 after batting for 10 dreary hours. Greg Chappell (1/54), Walters (1/35) and Stackpole (0/33) bowled 54 eight-ball overs between them to make up for the loss of a fourth bowler.

Australia – First Innings
My first innings in Test cricket was, as you might expect, a trying experience, but proved to be one of the best cricket lessons of my career, thanks to Ian Redpath. I came to the wicket with Australian reeling at 5/107 to join "Redders", who had watched three quick wickets fall at the other end. Illingworth and Snow, sensing that one more wicket would see them through our batting line up, stepped up their attack on the senior member of our partnership. "Snowy" concentrated his attack short of a length on "Redders" off-stump, with a liberal sprinkling of shorter pitched balls for good measure. Ian made a point of not playing at anything he didn't have to and ducked or swayed away from the shorter deliveries. Each time he swayed or ducked he came back to the upright position and sneered at "Snowy". It may not have looked all that pretty, but it was pretty effective as both Illingworth and Snow became more and more frustrated. Ian's example at the other end made me feel that if it meant that much to him to keep his wicket intact then I had better make sure I try just as hard at my end to keep mine intact. Fortunately we both succeeded and out partnership put us into a sound position, but from my point of view I had received an invaluable lesson in what Test match batting was all about from one of the most courageous batsmen ever to play for Australia.
Greg Chappell
John Snow (4/143) gave Australia a torrid start, sending Bill Lawry and Keith Stackpole back to the pavilion with 8 runs on the board, the batsmen having already survived lbw appeals from Ken Shuttleworth and Peter Lever. Lever then had Doug Walters caught behind by Alan Knott to make it 17/3. Ian Chappell (50) and Ian Redpath saw out the day and added 88 before they were parted, but Paul Sheahan was run out for 2 and Greg Chappell came in at 107/5. In 1968 a 21-year-old Chappell had batted for Somerset, but when they played Sussex at Hove he was cracked on the head by a nasty bouncer from Snow and forced to retire hurt. He was therefore under no illusions as to his likely reception from the fiery fast bowler in the Test arena. Redpath made his highest Test score of 171 before he was caught and bowled by Illingworth. Chappell spent 40 minutes making 1, but after tea he hit 58 runs inside an hour to bring up his maiden Test century, 108 in his first Test innings as they put on 219 for the sixth wicket. He was the eleventh Australian to make a century on his Ashes debut after Charles Bannerman, Harry Graham, Reggie Duff, Roger Hartigan, Herbie Collins, Bill Ponsford, Archie Jackson, Neil Harvey, Jim Burke and Doug Walters. He gave Brian Luckhurst a catch off Ken Shuttleworth, but "Bill Lawry didn't go crook on me when I got back into the rooms, so I guess it didn't matter". Rod Marsh added 40 and Australia overtook England's total with seven wickets down and ended with 440, a lead of 43.

England – Second Innings
England's fourth day batting made the death march seem like an Irish jig.
Frank Tyson
Boycott and Luckhurst accounted for the arrears by adding 60 for the first wicket, but the Yorkshireman was stumped by Rod Marsh off Gleeson on 98/1, Fletcher was lbw in the same over and Cowdrey soon followed and England were 101/4. John Edrich made typically stalwart 115 not out, batting for nearly six hours, and allowed Illingworth to make a late declaration on 287/6, leaving Australia 245 to win less than three hours, which Lawry described as a 'joke'.

Australia – Second Innings
The England substitute fielder John Hampshire gave the tourists the hope of a collapse when he caught Stackpole and Ian Chappell off John Snow (2/17) and Australia were 20/2. Snow was twice warned by Rowan for intimidatory bowling, but continued to bowl short. He was given an official warning, but Illingworth told him that this was to be his last over in any case and the fast bowler sent his last ball flying over the head of Doug Walters, turned to Rowan and said "Now that's a bouncer for you". Walters was bowled by Lever for 8, but Bill Lawry made 38 not out and Ian Redpath added an unbeaten 26 to his first innings century and the match ended with Australia 100/3.

Result
They came to watch cricket sanctioned by the uncharacteristically over-cautious Bradmans and Allens and the Illingworths and the Lawrys of this world, God pity them and theirs. And what was their reward? Some great bowling by John Snow, one great 50 by Greg Chappell, some cover drives from Geoff Boycott that would have done for Hobbs, Stackpole's occasional audacity and some wicketkeeping from Alan Knott that only Don Tallon has matched.
Richard Whitington
Australia and England drew the second Test to maintain their 0–0 tie in the series. Ray Illingworth blamed his bowlers and Bill Lawry his fieldsmen for their failure to win the match. 84,142 spectators paid $106,748 in gate money over the five days of the Test When the attendance figures were announced over the public address system and found to be almost double that of their Brisbane rivals there were large cheers from the Perth crowd.

Third Test – Melbourne

Our cricket administrators have been caught in the slops. But, perhaps, by unleashing this deluge, the gods have conspired to save us from the even greater boredom of having to watch another Test grind relentlessly to yet another draw.
Tony Larkins, Melbourne Herald
The Australian selectors dropped Paul Sheahan (who Don Bradman had tipped as the future captain of Australia) and Terry Jenner and brought back the experienced fast-medium bowler Alan Connolly and the off-spinner Ashley Mallett, even though he was not liked by Bill Lawry. England kept the same team from Perth. Ray Illingworth won the toss and decided to field, but rain began to fall before the teams went out and after three days of continuous rain the match was abandoned without a ball being bowled. Desperate attempts to dry the boggy outfield were made by Ian Johnson and the MCG ground staff, who claimed that "if the match had been in England the teams would have played. The outfield was good, the wicket firm and bowlers' run-ups safe". Each day they announced that play would be able to start "as soon as the rain stopped" to encourage spectators to come to the ground. One English writer said that the 8,000 people who arrived on the Thursday would have 'gladly paid a dollar each to permit the M.C.G. to buy a proper cover'. Sir Cyril Hawker, President of the MCC, and Gubby Allen, the treasurer, happened to be in Melbourne and with David Clark arranged the historic One Day International for the fifth day with Sir Donald Bradman and the Australian Board of Control. They also cancelled the second tour match between Victoria and the MCC so that an extra Test could be played. Ray Illingworth and the England players were not consulted and only found out when Bradman came into the dressing room to thank them for their co-operation. The players had severe misgivings about this state of affairs as the extra Test might cost them the Ashes and cancelled one of their rest days. They now had only five rest days in the last six weeks of the tour, and these included official receptions and engagements. There was also the question of pay and it was several weeks before Clark was able to grant an extra £100, long after the Australians had agreed a pay deal with their team.

First One Day International – Melbourne

Preliminaries
When Lawry won the toss and sent England into bat, the accepted move in one-day, limited number of overs games, I noted an edginess and expectation among player and crowd that had been absent, even from Test cricket, for decades.
Richard Whitington

The first One Day International was hastily arranged for what would have been the fifth day of the abandoned Third Test. Fortunately there were enough senior officials in Melbourne from the MCC and ACB to sanction the match. It was to consist of 40 eight-ball overs for each team (320 balls, or 53.2 six-ball overs). Many were surprised at the 46,000 crowd who turned up to watch.

England Innings
Then Boycott and Edrich began to run what in the Tests had been 'impossible' runs, to play what had been 'impossible' strokes...the Australian out-fieldsmen were hurling themselves about along the fence in a manner I had not seen for years in desperate endeavour to save fours and reduce runs.
Richard Whitington
Bill Lawry won the toss, elected to field and Garth McKenzie bowled the first ball to Geoff Boycott. To everyone's surprise Boycott and Edrich proceeded to hit the Australian bowlers around the ground and 'some of the less credulous Pressmen nearly fainted when John Edrich cracked Alan Connolly over mid off for four'. Alan Thomson was reduced to bowling 25 bouncers in 8 overs to reduce the run rate, but was not called for intimidation as they lacked menace. Lawry caught Boycott (8) off Alan Thomson (1/22) for the first wicket to fall in a One Day International after 21 runs had been added. Edrich made 82 runs off 119 balls and 'made all his partners look like hacks' No one else made 25 and he was instrumental in the England total of 190. Although spin bowlers were regarded as a target in one day cricket Ashley Mallett's off-spin took 3/34 and Keith Stackpole's part-time leg-spin 3/40, which compared favourably with the figures of the three fast bowlers Garth McKenzie (2/22), Alan Thomson (0/21) and Alan Connolly (0/62). England's 190 off 39.4 eight-ball overs was made at a rate of 60.12 runs per 100 balls (3.63 runs per six-ball over).

Australia Innings
The crowd were roaring their applause at every run now as Australia swept to 152 for 3 in 140 minutes and then Chappell, hooking and driving and cutting with a will, took 14 of 17 from D'Oliveira's sixth over.
Richard Whitington
Australian needed 191 runs to win and did so without any great trouble. John Snow's first ball was a wide, but both he and the batsman Bill Lawry had to signal it before Umpire Brooks accepted it. His second over was hit for 12 runs by Keith Stackpole, who was caught and bowled by Ken Shuttleworth for 13. Ian Chappell made an awkward start and was out paced by Lawry, who made many quick singles until caught by Knott off Ray Illingworth (3/50), the only Englishman to bowl with conviction and Alan Knott took another catch and a stumping. With Snow taken off Ian Chappell 'went mad', hitting Illingworth for a six and a four and hooking and pulling Basil d'Oliveira for 26 runs in two overs, ending with 60 runs off 103 balls. Doug Walters made hay with 41 off 51 balls with 6 fours as he added 66 with Chappell for the third wicket. Greg Chappell (22 not out) batted 'like an Australian Peter May' and Australia won comfortably by five wickets. Their 191/5 off 34.6 eight-ball overs was made at a rate of 68.70 runs per 100 balls (4.12 runs per six-ball over).

Result
Terrific. If they played cricket all the time like this, they'd pack the M.C.G. No risk. You can't tell me there's any less skill involved. I'd reckon there's more skill.
Ben Gazzardi of Traralgon, La Trobe Valley, Victoria
Australia won the first One Day International by five wickets on the same ground where they had won the first Test match 93 years before. They won $2,400 and England $400 from the sponsors Rothmans. John Edrich was awarded $200 as Man of the Match by the England umpire Charlie Elliott because "without John's 82 there'd have been no match". Despite the rain over the previous week 46,006 spectators paid $33,894.40 to attend the game, which was completed without a hitch. Even opponents of the limited over game such as E. W. Swanton admitted "There is clearly a great future in this sort of thing", and within a few years One Day International games were being played all over the cricketing world.

Fourth Test – Sydney

Preliminaries
If you recall my would-be Sherlock Holmesian assessment of Professor Moriarty's – sorry, Professor Illingworth's – plan to recapture the Ashes, you will remember that it is in Sydney, in the Fourth Test, that this cricketing chess player is due to strike and then retire to the corner of his web and seal off reprisals. Those who command the condition of Sydney Cricket Ground and its accessories gave him just the pitch he needed. By this time, I fancy, they were nauseated by negation and demanded a win at any price – even at the price of Australian defeat.
Richard Whitington
Unlike the flat, over-rolled batting tracks at the other venues the famous spinning wicket at the S.C.G. was expected to give a result and Bill Lawry announced "This time there will be a result for sure". England replaced their out of form vice-captain Colin Cowdrey with his Kentish team-mate Derek Underwood to give them five specialist bowlers. Ken Shuttleworth was replaced by fast bowler Bob Willis, playing his first Test. The Australians announced their team before the One Day International had been played, too late to replace Alan Connolly who had been hit for 62 runs off eight overs in the knockabout game. The erratic fast-medium bowler Alan Thomson was replaced on the field by the spinner John Gleeson. Thomson was made twelfth man, but was so popular that drinks were served two overs late as he struggled though the crowd of people chatting to him and patting him on the back Ray Illingworth won the toss again and chosen to bat on a 'hot and hostile' pitch which looked like helping the seamers, but was predicted to take increasing turn.

England – First Innings
This day Boycott was not so permissive and his innings shone like a sapphire in the sun. Lawry's field-settings seemed to be mirrored in the Yorkshireman's mind, so much so that when he went for his strokes there might as well have been no fieldsmen on the ground.
Richard Whitington
The wicket was not quite the batsman's paradise of the previous Tests, but after bowling a couple of maidens Garth McKenzie conceded 15 runs off his third over. Brian Luckhurst kept trying to steal singles, while his partner Geoff Boycott kept sending him back and England were 100/0 at lunch. Boycott was caught hooking by John Gleeson at fine-leg for 77 out of 116, and Gleeson had Luckhurst leg before wicket for 38 at 130/2. John Edrich made 55 before Gleeson caught him off Greg Chappell, Ashley Mallett (4/40) accounted for Fletcher and D'Oliveira, had Alan Knott stumped by Marsh to reduce England from 200/2 to 219/6. Gleeson bowled Illingworth for 24 and England were 267/7 at the end of the day. John Snow (37) made runs in the morning but Gleeson (4/83) struck again, dismissing him and Underwood in successive balls. Peter Lever (36) and Bob Willis (15 not out) added 41 for the last wicket to carry England to 332, the lowest first innings total of the series so far.

Australian – First Innings
Snow's first second-spell over the Walters and Redpath resembles one of those oldtime bombardments on the World War I Western Front. His first delivery was just short of a length and straight. His second was a lofty bumper, under which Walters ducked. His third was lifting offside ball...The fifth ball, called a no-ball by Umpire Rowan, was perhaps the most vicious bumper of all...Redpath turned his back on this one and the thud on his rump could be heard from most parts of the ground.
Richard Whitington
The Australian captain Bill Lawry chose to open with his vice-captain Ian Chappell, who did not look happy at the prospect, and Keith Stackpole was returned to the middle order. Strangely, Lawry did not consider opening with fellow-Victorian Ian Redpath during the series, despite having made a double century opening stand together against South Africa. However, in the 1970–71 season Lawry opened the Victorian batting with Keith Stackpole with 'Redders' coming in at number three. Lawry and Chappell were soon out and it was Redpath (64) and Doug Walters (55) who made the most of Australian's 189/4 by the end of what was regarded as the best day's play of the series. Their stand of 99 was made against the hostile bowling of John Snow (1/23) and Bob Willis (0/26), with the barrackers on the infamous Sydney Hill started hooting and counting Snow out as he bowled a host of short balls. in the end it was the spinners who did the damage, Walters was caught off Ray Illingworth (1/59) after being deceived in flight. Greg Chappell had just been made Australia's Sportsman of the Year 1970 ahead of Evonne Goolagong, Margaret Court, Heather McKay and Rod Laver, but was caught and bowled by Derek Underwood for 15 and Keith Fletcher caught Redpath off Basil d'Oliveira's off-spin (2/20) just before stumps. Resuming after the rest day Deadly Derek (4/66) dismissed Stackpole, Marsh and Mallett as Australia collapsed to 208/8 and 236 all out, 96 runs behind.

England – Second Innings
There are runs in that wicket but you have to be prepared to work for them.
Ray Illingworth
England now had two and a half days to pile up the runs and set Australia an impossible target on a wearing wicket. Geoff Boycott took nearly seven hours to make 142 not out having seen his partners Luckhurst, Edrich (run out by Boycott) and Fletcher depart with only 48 runs on the board. He added 133 with d'Oliveira (56), 95 with Illingworth (53) and 43 with Knott (21 not out) before the captain declared at 319/5 on the afternoon of the fourth day.

Australian – Second Innings
I had not seen an Englishman bowl either faster or better than Snow at Sydney since Tyson...In a fast bowler rhythm and accuracy generally go hand in hand. When everything is absolutely ticking, so to speak, a strong fellow like Snow finds not only an extra yard of pace but seems able to keep an unerring eye on the target. The merit of Snow is that in this form is not only that that high arm and loose wrist get the utmost life and lift from the pitch but that he is so extraordinarily straight.
E.W. Swanton
Australia were set 416 runs for victory, in 1970 no Test team had ever made such a total to win a Test match and Bill Lawry announced there was "no way" they could win. It quickly became apparent that Australia would not be breaking any batting records as John Snow (7/40) soon dismissed Ian Redpath and both Chappells, Doug Walters fell to Peter Lever, one of Alan Knott's three catches, and Australia were 21/4. Bill Lawry (60 not out) and Keith Stackpole (30) took them to 60/4 by stumps, but Stackpole was caught off Snow the next morning, followed by Marsh for a duck. Willis (1/1) took his first Test wicket, Garth McKenzie retired hurt after being hit in the face by a rising ball from Snow and retired from Test cricket just two wickets short of Richie Benaud's Australian record haul of 248. Snow finished off the tail, bowling Gleeson for a duck and Connolly three balls later and Australia were all out for 116, Lawry carrying his bat throughout the debacle. It was a superb piece of fast bowling from Snow, aggressive, hostile and decisive.

Result
The Australian 'Humpty Dumpty'  had fallen from the wall and, in our disgust at its fragility, we wondered how even all the king's horse and all the king's men, let alone Sir Donald Bradman, Sam Loxton and Neil Harvey, could put it together again.
Richard Whitington
England won by a huge margin of 299 runs, their biggest victory in Australia since 1936–37 to go 1–0 up in the series with three Tests to play. Geoff Boycott (77 and 142 not out) scored more runs for an English batsmen in Australia since Denis Compton (147 and 103 not out) in the Fourth Test of the 1946–47 Ashes series, a total since exceeded by Alastair Cook (67 and 235 not out) in the First Test of the 2010–11 Ashes series. John Snow (7/40) became the eighth England bowler to take seven wickets in a Test innings in Australia after Tom Richardson (8/94), George Lohmann (8/35 and 8/58), Wilfred Rhodes (7/56 and 8/68), Doug Wright (7/105), Frank Tyson (7/27), Brian Statham (7/57) and Fred Titmus (7/79). 101,694 spectators came to the see the Test, paying $71,017 in gate money.

Fifth Test – Melbourne

Preliminaries
Illingworth had moulded his men into a team. They had one mission uppermost in mind. High living, if it came at all, could come later.
Richard Whitington
This Test was added to the series to make up for the abandoned Third Test despite the reservations of some of the England players, replacing the Victoria vs MCC tour match scheduled for 22–26 January 1971. After the heavy defeat at Sydney the response of the Australian press was to "Sack the Lot!", but the selectors kept all their failing batsman and reshuffled their limited bowling attack, dropping Garth McKenzie, their fast bowling spearhead of the 1960s who had been injured by Snow, and Ashley Mallett despite his 4/40. The fast-medium bowler Alan Thomson swopped his twelfth man position with Alan Connolly The fast-medium bowler Ross Duncan made his Test debut, as did the leg-spinning all-rounder Kerry O'Keeffe who had taken 6/69 and hit 55 not out against the tourists earlier in the season. England recalled their vice-captain Colin Cowdrey (who had been in the nets for much of the Fourth Test) to replace Keith Fletcher, who had been injured in the tour match against North New South Wales. Brian Luckhurst bruised his fingers in the same game and had retired hurt, but was declared fit to play. Australian umpire Max O'Connell was officiating in his first Test.

Australian – First Innings
Snow aroused the ire of the crowd by firing down two bumpers to welcome back the retired hurt Bill Lawry back on the deck...A barracker yelled, 'Why don't you try to bump one onto the sightscreen, Snow? Bowl at the wicket.' Snow did just that next ball and took Redpath's leg stump – around behind his legs. Three for 269.
Richard Whitington
Bill Lawry won the toss and chose to bat on a good wicket with Keith Stackpole as his new opening partner. John Snow sent down three bouncers in the first four balls and Stackpole was caught by wicket-keeper Alan Knott off the last ball of the first over. However, he was given not out because Max O'Connell called "over" early and had already started his walk to square leg. Consequently, he had not seen the catch and had to give Stackpole not out. Instead Stackpole (30) and Lawry (56) added 64 for the first wicket when d'Oliveira dismissed Stackpole, soon followed by Lawry who retired hurt on 38 after he was hit on the hand several times with the score 86/1. They were followed by Ian Chappell (111) and Ian Redpath (72) who added another 180, a total of 202 for the second wicket. Lawry returned at 266/2 to a flurry of short balls from Snow, saw Redpath go on 269/3, but added 49 with Doug Walters (55). Bob Willis took 3/79 as the wickets were shared around the unfortunate England bowlers, whose cause was not helped by 8 dropped catches, 4 by Cowdrey's normally safe hands. Cowdrey and Chappell then had their Test caps stolen when the crowd invaded the pitch to celebrate Chappell's maiden Ashes century. Rod Marsh made 92 not out, after being dropped twice in one over off Derek Underwood, equalling the record set by Don Tallon for highest score by an Australian wicket-keeper. But Lawry declared the innings after batting for over 11 hours at 493/9 to get an extra hour of bowling before stumps at the end of the second day. When questioned by the press about his lost chance to make an historic century Marsh said he had gained forty runs instead of missing eight as he thought Lawry should have declared an hour earlier. Marsh would later make 132 against New Zealand at Adelaide in 1973–74, the first century by an Australian wicket-keeper, and his maiden Ashes century (110 not out) in the 1976–77 Centenary Test.

England – First Innings
Lawry's unimaginative, deep field-settings for his spinners sent a highly expectant, eager-for-victory crowd of 65,000 home unhappy. Even the most loyal Victorian could see, and admit, that Lawry was not the captain to arrest those escaping Ashes.
Richard Whitington
England survived the day without losing a wicket, thus negating the advantage of Lawry's early declaration and adding to the criticism he received in the press. The next morning "Froggie" Thomson (3/110) dismissed Boycott and Edrich, John Gleeson (3/60) caught and bowled Colin Cowdrey and England were 88/3. Brian Luckhurst made a brave 109 to save the innings despite his hands being damaged again by Thomson's short-pitched bowling. He had three fingers of his right hand bound together and his left hand was in plaster, but he added 140 with Basil d'Oliveira (117). Thomson fired down six bouncers in one over against Ray Illingworth (41) and several more at John Snow, who was bowled by Ian Chappell for 1 after a stay of 47 minutes. Knott and Snow complained about Kerry O'Keeffe's "suspect" bowling action and were backed by Illingworth, which did not improve their popularity with the public, and Illingworth was booed in the final Tests as a result. England were finally out after tea on the fourth day for 392, 101 runs behind Australia.

Australia – Second Innings
While Illingworth was guilty of go-slow tactics it was Lawry who helped put the lid on the coffin throughout the sweltering afternoon. His safety-first tactics were totally incomprehensible...Lawry Stackpole and Chappell were sad figures in that vast arena as they poked and prodded and had absolutely no desire to score runs as a reasonable pace.
Eric Beecher, Australian Cricket magazine
Australia needed quick runs for a declaration, but Lawry spent two and a half hours making 42 and Ian Chappell over two hours for 30. John Snow bowled 12 eight ball overs for a mere 21 runs and the wickets of Lawry and Redpath. He was warned for intimidatory bowling by Max O'Connell after bowling short at Doug Walters (39 not out), despite no action having been taken against Thomson's bouncers earlier in the Test. Snow was also photographed picking at the seam of a Kookaburra cricket ball, which caused a furore in the Australian press until it was realised that the Kookaburra did not have a seam and Snow had been playing a practical joke on the cameraman. Lawry finally declared at 169/4, leaving England to make 271 in four hours.

England – Second Innings
Do you want any more? I did not. I drove off to Adelaide...to face the next ordeal...
Richard Whitington
An adventurous or desperate captain might have taken up the challenge, but Illingworth was neither, Geoffrey Boycott and John Edrich were disinclined to throw their wickets away and had made an unbeaten stand of 161 when the game finally drew to a close. Ross Duncan in his only Test made 3 and took 0/30 in the first innings, did not bat or bowl in the second and took no catches.

Result
Australia and England drew the Fifth Test to maintain England's 1–0 lead in the series. 184,503 spectators attended, paying $135,022.80 in gate money.

Sixth Test – Adelaide

Preliminaries
We were watching the crucifixion of cricket with Lawry and Illingworth washing their hands...like two Pontius Pilates.
Richard Whitington
With the Fourth Test replacing the tour match against Victoria Australia and England played back to back Test matches only two days apart, unusual at the time. Australian dropped the unfortunate Ross Duncan and brought in a tearaway young fast bowler called Dennis Lillee for his debut. Leg-spinner Kerry O'Keeffe was replaced by off-spinner Ashley Mallett on his home ground. England replaced the injured batsmen Brian Luckhurst and out of form vice-captain Colin Cowdrey with John Hampshire and Keith Fletcher, who was fit again after missing the Fifth Test.

England – First Innings
We were near the entrance to a bar when a roar penetrated the alleyway under the stairs. It was a kind of reaction from a crowd I'd not heard before...The roar went on...and on. There was no following applause to greet a departing batsman. The roar dropped to a murmur. Then there was silence. It was all very eerie.
Richard Whitington
England won the toss and understandably decided to bat, with a 1–0 lead in the series they had no incentive to hurry and spent ten and a half hours making 470. Bill Lawry gave the new ball to 'Froggie' Thomason and had debutant Dennis Lillee bowling into a strong southerly wind, even so Lillee was yards faster than Thomson, and more accurate. Geoff Boycott (58) and John Edrich (130) added 107 for the first wicket before Boycott was given run out despite his strong opinion to the contrary. E.W. Swanton in the commentary box shouted "He's out!" when Ian Chappell threw down the stumps and as he had failed to ground his bat when reaching the crease Umpire O'Connell had given him out. Convincing Boycott that he was out was always a difficult business and his displeasure was obvious when he threw his bat to the ground, he caused further trouble when he pointedly refused to apologise to the umpires for his behaviour (Boycott later apologised to Umpire O'Connell in private). He stormed off the field with the crowd howling in his ears and to wide condemnation by the press when a photograph showed he was clearly out. Some called on David Clark to withdraw Boycott's £150 good conduct bonus and Keith Miller said "This will cost Boycott the England and maybe also the Yorkshire captaincy". Keith Fletcher returned to form with 80 out of a stand of 169 with Edrich before the Surrey opener was caught by Stackpole to give Lillee his first, hard earned, Test wicket. Lillee (5/84) dismissed Alan Knott, Alan Thomson bowled Fletcher and England lost three wickets for 13 runs, but soon found their way again. Basil D'Oliveira (47), John Hampshire (55), Ray Illingworth (24) and John Snow (38) took them to 458/6 before Lillee cleared up the tail, the last four wickets falling for twelve runs.

Australia – First Innings
The cream of Australian batsmanship, barring one or two Test rejects, had curdled...
Richard Whitington
Bill Lawry and Keith Stackpole opened and Stackpole made 87 out of 117/2 before he was bowled by Derek Underwood. Australia collapsed to 180/7 thanks to Peter Lever (4/49). Rod Marsh and Ashley Mallett both made 28 and added 39 for the eighth wicket, but they were all out for 235 on Australia Day, exactly half of England's score.

England – Second Innings
Both Ray Illingworth and Bill Lawry have done some mystifying things this series, but the English captain must about win the prize with his decision not to force Australia to follow on...I know, for sure, that our captain in South Africa, Ali Bacher, would have told Lawry to put the pads on again.
Barry Richards
Peter Lever had a shoulder strain, John Snow was suffering from an inflamed sacroiliac joint and they did not feel that they could bowl through another innings. The 40-year-old Illingworth was tired himself, took the advice of his bowlers and chose not to enforce the follow on, instead batting Australia out of the game. This caused great surprise to the pundits and old Test cricketers at the ground who felt that he had let Australia off the hook, This was a situation made for Geoff Boycott and ignoring the furore caused by his first innings he made 119 not out, making another century opening stand with John Edrich (40). Thomson (3–79) took three quick wickets to help reduce 103/0 to 151/4, but Ray Illingworth (48 not out) added 82 with Boycott before declaring on 233/4.

Australia – Second Innings
If the Australians play for turn they'll lose. If they play for no turn, they'll hit him in the middle of the bat.
Denis Compton
Faced with an impossible 469 runs to win Australia had no choice but to try to bat out almost 9 hours of play. Lawry (21) added 65 for the first wicket with Stackpole who made 136 with 16 fours. It would have been 17 boundaries but the ball was stopped in the outfield when it hit a seagull, which survived the experience and flew away. He added 202 for the second wicket with Ian Chappell (104), who was dropped by Colin Cowdrey off John Snow early in his innings. When they were out in the final session Ian Redpath (21 not out) and Doug Walters (36 not out) saw out the day for 328/3.

Result
Strong Recovery in Australian Bacon.
Headline from the Adelaide Advertiser on the last day of the Test
Australia and England drew another Test to maintain England's 1–0 lead in the series. 98,808 spectators attended, paying $65,836 in gate money.

Seventh Test – Sydney

Preliminaries
Bill Lawry, a defensive captain, had failed so far to defend the Ashes. Was he more likely to be able to regain the ascendancy? Of course not. Was he more likely to return to his former batting form, his early club and Shield batting form, if he were diplomatically relieved of the responsibility of leadership? Of course, yes. All the more likely if he were undiplomatically removed, because he would be nursing a grudge, burning to stage reprisals...
Richard Whitington
Fully aware that they needed to win the last Test to retain the Ashes the Australian selectors axed Bill Lawry, the first Australian captain ever to be dropped mid-series. Don Bradman, Sam Loxton and Neil Harvey delayed the announcement while they tried to locate Lawry at the end of the Sixth Test, but he had already left for his home in Melbourne and they were unable to find him. He first heard the news on the radio and the selectors were much maligned in the press as a result. Lawry never played for Australia again despite being only 33 and averaging 47.15, but began his 40-year career as a commentator in the Seventh Test, saying "Well, I suppose we all have to get around to it some day". Although the appointment of the more aggressive Ian Chappell as captain (with Ian Redpath as his vice-captain) made sense, Lawry was still a redoubtable opening batsman who averaged 40.50 in the series and many thought that his services should have been retained. Instead the veteran Victorian opener Ken Eastwood was called up for his only Test after having made 177 against New South Wales. John Gleeson, Ashley Mallett and Ross Duncan were all dropped and replaced by debutant Tony Dell, a left-arm fast medium bowler, and the leg-spinners Kerry O'Keeffe and Terry Jenner. The selectors made another mistake in not recalling Garth McKenzie to partner his Western Australia team-mate Dennis Lillee after he had broken Geoff Boycott's arm on the same ground in a one-day match. McKenzie could have been a real handful for the England batsmen, and was only two wickets short of Richie Benaud's Australian Test record of 248 wickets (Benaud wrote 'Bring back McKenzie' in his newspaper column). This meant Australia's four-man bowling attack had only 6 Test wickets to their name, the least since Wellington in 1945–46 when seven players made their debut after the war. Boycott was, of course, unfit to play and Brian Luckhurst returned to open the innings, having missed the Sixth Test because of his bruised hands. John Snow had been suffering from an inflamed sacroiliac joint, which required traction and complete rest, but he was declared fit in time for the Test. This was Australian umpire Lou Rowan's last Test as he retired at the end of the season and the Australian selectors Don Bradman retired after 35 years, out of which Australia had held the Ashes for all but 6 years.

England – First Innings
Ian's got off to a great start as captain of Australia.
Bill Lawry
A good County attack would have had England out for 150.
Trevor Bailey
Ian Chappell won the toss and fielded on a damp wicket with slow, uneven bounce that had produced the decisive Fourth Test victory for England. The injured Brian Luckhurst took 37 minutes over his duck before was dismissed by Doug Walters (1/10) and England took an hour to reach 11/1. John Edrich (30) and Keith Fletcher (33) took the score to 60/1, but Dell (2/32) took his first Test wicket – Edrich caught by Greg Chappell – and England collapsed to 98/5 thanks to the leg-spinners Terry Jenner (3/42) and Kerry O'Keeffe (3/48), who were kept on even when the new ball became available. Ray Illingworth fought back with a solid 42 before he was bowled by Jenner, but England were all out for 184 and things were going Australia's way.

Australia – First Innings
Following another round of booing and the throwing of more cans, Illingworth ordered and led his men from the field and I noticed that to some of them he had to repeat his order at least twice...Had the Englishmen remained on the field I doubt whether play could have resumed.
Richard Whitington

Test Match Special – Illingworth leads England off the field

Peter Lever (3/43) had Ken Eastwood caught behind by Alan Knott and John Snow (1/68) removed Keith Stackpole's off stump with a ball that came back a foot after pitching to leave Australian 13/2 at the end of the first day. Bob Willis (3/58) caught the nightwatchman Rod Marsh and bowled Ian Chappell the next morning and they were 66/4, but Ian Redpath (59) and Doug Walters (42) added 81. Walters was stumped on 41 by Knott, who made 6 dismissals in the match, but 'when Umpire Rowan ruled Walters not out, Knott stood on the edge of the popping crease as if paralysed with unbelief. Walters was stumped off Underwood (2/39) on 42 and given out by Umpire O'Connell and the spinner caught and bowled Ian Redpath. When Kerry O'Keeffe was out at 178/7 Greg Chappell (65) was left alone with the tail.

Terry Jenner retired hurt when he ducked into a short delivery from Snow on 8. Rowan warned the fast bowler for intimidatory bowling yet again, but Snow and Illingworth objected strongly, the captain saying "That's the only bouncer he's bowled" and that he would complain to the ABC, but Snow had bowled three other short balls at Jenner earlier in the over and Bob Willis had been brought in for the mis-hit. Rowan later claimed that Illingworth and Snow swore at him, which they denied. The bowler was loudly booed and "when he returned to his fielding position at long-leg Snow was pelted with bottles, cans and partially eaten pies". Some of the crowd wanted to shake his hand, but then he was grabbed by a drunk at Paddington Hill who was forced to let go by other spectators. In 1998 the eighty-year-old Trevor Guy told the Sydney Morning Herald that he was the man who had grabbed Snow in order to tell him what he thought about him hitting Jenner. Guy and Snow, in Australia for the 1998–99 Ashes series, agreed that they had no hard feelings about the matter. To avoid injury to his team Illingworth took his men back to the dressing room without the permission of the umpires, an unprecedented move in Test cricket. He later justified his action by saying "I've seen people hit by bottles and it makes a bloody mess of them". The England manager David Clark tried to push Illingworth back onto the field and Lou Rowan told them that if they did not immediately return they would forfeit the match (and the Ashes) and was supported by Alan Barnes of the ABC. A furious Illingworth said he would not return until the playing area had been cleared and the crowd had calmed down. Furthermore, he strongly objected to Clark constantly siding with the Australians against his own team. It took seven minutes for the groundstaff to move the debris, during which one was hit on the head with a beer-can and had to be taken to hospital, though most of the 40 cans were for soft drinks. The Australian batsmen Greg Chappell and Dennis Lillee remained at the crease throughout the incident.

Jenner returned to bat at 235/8 and made a brave 30, last man out on 264 to give Australia a lead of 80 runs.

England – Second Innings
Illingworth led his team from the front, on and off the field during the seventh Test, giving to his task everything he had – even bowling for long periods on about 1½ legs while the issue was in the balance and battling with officials in the dressing room over the last two days...Had Chappell had Lawry amongst his batsmen and McKenzie partnering his State colleague Lillee with the new ball, it is more than possible that Australia would have won this match against the depleted Englishmen and by drawing the series retained the Ashes.
Richard Whitington

The ever-reliable England openers Luckhurst (59) and Edrich (57) made 94 for the first wicket and the first nine batsmen all made double figures, but only Basil D'Oliveira (47) really got going as Dell (3/85) and O'Keeffe (3/96) regularly took wickets. Ken Eastwood (1/21), who barely bowled even at grade level, was brought on and took Keith Fletcher's wicket with his slow left-arm wrist-spin, caught by Keith Stackpole. The scoring rate was understandably slow as England had the triple objective of overhauling their first innings deficit, batting out the match and setting Australia a large fourth innings target. In the end they took seven and a half hours to make 302, batting well into the fourth day.

Australia – Second Innings
One of the surprising, yet pleasant, features of the innings was the tremendous applause accord Snow after he bowled Eastwood for nought behind his (Eastwood's) legs. All John's efforts to remain the villain of the piece had failed. He was even applauded the whole way back to his old querencia by the crowd on The Hill.
Richard Whitington

Test Match Special – England win the Ashes

Australia were set 223 to win and retain the Ashes and their hopes must have been high even after Snow yorked Ken Eastwood for a duck. Unfortunately for England Snow had to retire after two overs when he smashed his finger on the wooden boundary fence trying to catch a six off Keith Stackpole. He was taken to hospital for an operation under general anaesthetic to reconstruct his shattered finger bones. Stackpole was caught off a thick edge by Alan Knott off Peter Lever on 13, but was given not out, much to the disappointment of England skipper Ray Illingworth who said "It was really unbelievable". Stackpole hit 2 sixes and 6 fours in his 67, but received little support as the rest of the team folded. Illingworth took 3/39 off 20 eight ball overs and accounted for Stackpole, Redpath and Greg Chappell, d'Oliveira took 2/15 and Underwood 2/28 on a spinning wicket and Australia were all out for 160 to lose by 62 runs. The last wicket was that of Terry Jenner caught by Keith Fletcher off Derek Underwood, after which the England team chaired Ray Illingworth off the field in celebration.

Aftermath
Looking back over the series it is impossible to nominate any department of the game in which Australia were superior. For England to have lost this match and only drawn the series would have been a gross miscarriage of justice. Undoubtedly, they have been the better team throughout. Boycott established himself as a master batsman and John Snow stood head and shoulders over any bowler in the series.
Bobby Simpson

England won the series 2–0 to regain the Ashes and celebrated in style. It was the only time a touring team has played a full Test series in Australia without losing a Test and the third and last time that Australia hosted a Test series without winning a Test in the season, the others being in 1886–87 and 1887–88. 96,834 spectators attended, paying $68,081.90 in gate money, a total of 678,486 people over the whole series (paying $532,220) with an estimated 30,000,000 watching it on television. Alan Knott had made a record 24 dismissals in a Test series, beating Wally Grout's 23 against the West Indies in 1960–61. John Snow's 31 wickets (22.83) was the most by an England bowler in Australia since Harold Larwood's 33 wickets (19.51) in 1932–33. No England bowler after Snow has taken 25 wickets in a Test series in Australia. Geoffrey Boycott's 657 runs (93.85) the most by an England batsman in Australia since Wally Hammond's 905 (113.12) in 1928–29. John Edrich's 648 runs (72.00) kept him at the crease for 33 hours and 26 minutes, a record for a Test series until broken by Shivnarine Chanderpaul against India in 2001–02. Snow recalled 'the champagne-filled, beer-laden, hangover-inducing rejoicings of Sydney'. and Basil d'Oliveira pushed his forefinger into the chest of the every Australian he met, saying "We stuffed you". Geoffrey Boycott and John Snow returned home early to recover from their injuries, and would face a disciplinary hearing at Lords for their behaviour on the field. The rest of the team proceeded to New Zealand for the second leg of their long tour.

1970–71 Test Series Averages
source

Annual reviews
 Playfair Cricket Annual 1971
 Wisden Cricketers' Almanack 1971

Further reading
 Peter Arnold, The Illustrated Encyclopaedia of World of Cricket, W.H. Smith, 1985
 Geoffrey Boycott, Boycott: The Autobiography, Pan Books, 2006
 Mark Browning, Rod Marsh: A Life in Cricket, Rosenberg Publishing, 2003
 Ian Brayshaw, The Chappell Era, ABC Enterprises, 1984
 Ian Chappell and Ashley Mallett, Hitting Out: The Ian Chappell Story, Orion, 2006
 Chris Cowdrey and Jonathan Smith, Good Enough, Pelham Books, 1986
 Colin Cowdrey, M. C. C. The Autobiography of a Cricketer, Coronet Books, 1977
 Basil d'Oliveira, Time to Declare: An Autobiography, Star, 1982
 Basil d'Oliveira, Basil d'Oliveira: Cricket and Controversy, Sphere, 2005
 Bill Frindall, The Wisden Book of Test Cricket 1877–1978, Wisden, 1979
 Colin Firth, Pageant of Cricket, The Macmillan Company of Australia,1987
 Chris Harte, A History of Australian Cricket, Andre Deutsch, 1993
 Ed Jaggard, Garth: The Story of Graham McKenzie, Fremantle Arts Centre Press, 1993
 Ken Kelly and David Lemmon, Cricket Reflections: Five Decades of Cricket Photographs, Heinemann, 1985
 Dennis Lillee, Lillee, My Life in Cricket, Methuen Australia, 1982
 Dennis Lillee, Menace: the Autobiography, Headline Book Publishing, 2003
 Brian Luckhurst and Mike Baldwin, Boot Boy to President, KOS Media, 2004
 Ashley Mallett, Rowdy, Lynton Publications, 1973
 Ashley Mallett, Spin Out, Garry Sparke & Associates, 1977
 Ashley Mallett, One of a Kind: The Doug Walters Story, Orion, 2009
 Rod Marsh, The Gloves of Irony, Pan, 1999
 Adrian McGregor, Greg Chappell, Collins, 1985
 Mark Peel, The Last Roman: A Biography of Colin Cowdrey, Andre Deutsch Ltd, 1999
 Ray Robinson, On Top Down Under, Cassell, 1975
 Lou Rowan, The Umpires Story with an Analysis of the laws of cricket, Jack Pollard, 1972
 Keith Stackpole and Alan Trenglove, Not Just For Openers, Stockwell Press, 1974
 Mike Stevenson, Illy: A Biography Of Ray Illingworth, Midas Books, 1978
 E.W. Swanton (ed), The Barclays World of Cricket, Collins, 1986
 Derek Underwood, Beating the Bat: An Autobiography, S.Paul, 1975
 Bob Willis, Lasting the Pace, Collins, 1985

Video
 Allan Border and David Gower, The Best of the Ashes – 1970–1987, 2 Entertain Video, 1991

DVD
 David Steele, England Cricket Six of the Best: The Seventies, A Sharpe Focus Production for Green Umbrella, 2009 (showing England's 299 run victory in the Fourth Test at Sydney in 1970–71)

References

Bibliography
 
 Greg Chappell, Old Hands Showed The Way, Test Series Official Book 1986–87, The Clashes for the Ashes, Australia vs England, Playbill Sport Publication, 1986
 Ian Chappell, Austin Robertson and Paul Rigby, Chappelli Has the Last Laugh, Lansdowne Press, 1980
 Criss Freddi, The Guinness Book of Cricket Blunders, Guinness Publishing, 1996
 David Gower, Heroes and Contemporaries, Granada Publishing Ltd, 1985
 Tom Graveney and Norman Miller, The Ten Greatest Test Teams, Sidgewick and Jackson, 1988
 John Snow, Cricket Rebel: An Autobiography, Littlehampton Book Services Ltd, 1976
 
 Huw Turbervill, The Toughest Tour: The Ashes Away Series: 1946 to 2007, Aurum Press Ltd, 2010

External links
 CricketArchive tour itinerary

Ashes series
Ashes series
Ashes series
Ashes series
Ashes series
International cricket competitions from 1970–71 to 1975
The Ashes